Malian passports are issued to Malian citizens to travel outside Mali. It is the only proof for international travel. It can also be used in identification for a national registration card or driver's license. It is also the primary proof for citizenship.

Types
There are three types of passports, each with its own eligibility criteria.

 Ordinary passport
 Official passport
 Diplomatic passport

Requirement for passport application
An applicant is required to provide the following supporting documents and the prevailing fees before being issued a new passport.

 Birth certificate
 Certificates of identity
 Proof of citizenship
 Passport-size photographs
 Self-addressed stamped envelope

Passport information
The information below is stated on the identification page in French and English.

  Type
  Passport No. 	
  Given name(s) 	
  Date of birth 	
  Sex
  Place of birth
  Place of Issue 	
  Date of expiry
  Surname
  Nationality
  Residence
  Date of issue

Passport cover

Malian passports are dark brown and have the words "République du Mali" inscribed above the Malian coat of arms in the centre of the cover. Beneath this is the word "Passeport" (on ordinary passports).

See also
Visa requirements for Malian citizens
 ECOWAS passports
 List of passports
 Republic of Mali

References

Passports by country
Foreign relations of Mali
Government of Mali